Hans Berger (1873–1941) was a German psychiatrist.

Hans Berger may also refer to:

Hans Berger (aircraft manufacturer), Swiss inventor and helicopter builder
Hans Berger (boxer) (1906–1973), German boxer
Hans Georg Berger (born 1951), German-born photographer and writer